|}

The Irish St Leger is a Group 1 flat horse race in Ireland open to thoroughbreds aged three years or older. It is run at the Curragh over a distance of 1 mile and 6 furlongs (2,816 metres), and it is scheduled to take place each year in September.

It is Ireland's equivalent of the St Leger Stakes, a famous race in England (although unlike the English race, it is open to both horses above age three and geldings).

History
The event was established in 1915, and it was originally restricted to three-year-olds. The first horse to win both the English and Irish St Legers was Royal Lancer in 1922.

The first Irish St. Leger winner to complete a Triple Crown (having previously won the Irish 2,000 Guineas and the Irish Derby) was Museum in 1935. The only subsequent horse to win all three races was Windsor Slipper in 1942.

The Irish St Leger became an open-age race in 1983, and there have been several repeat winners since then. The most successful has been Vinnie Roe, with four consecutive victories from 2001 to 2004.

The leading horses from the Irish St Leger sometimes go on to compete in the Melbourne Cup. The race has been sponsored by the Comer Group since 2014. It takes place on the second day of Irish Champions Weekend.

Records
<div style="font-size:90%">
Most successful horse (4 wins):
 Vinnie Roe – 2001, 2002, 2003, 2004

Leading jockey (7 wins):
 Morny Wing – Kirk-Alloway (1920), O'Dempsey (1923), Sol de Terre (1930), Ochiltree (1938), Windsor Slipper (1942), Spam (1945), Esprit de France (1947)

Leading trainer (9 wins):
 Vincent O'Brien – Barclay (1959), White Gloves (1966), Reindeer (1969), Caucasus (1975), Meneval (1976), Transworld (1977), Gonzales (1980), Leading Counsel (1985), Dark Lomond (1988)
 Dermot Weld - Vintage Crop (1993, 1994), Vinnie Roe (2001, 2002, 2003, 2004), Voleuse de Coeurs (2013), Search for A Song (2019, 2020)

Leading owner since 1960 (6 wins) (includes part ownership):
 Susan Magnier - Yeats (2007), Septimus (2008), Order of St George (2015, 2017), Flag of Honour (2018), Kyprios (2022) </div>

Winners since 1972

Earlier winners

 1915: La Paloma
 1916: Captive Princess
 1917: Double Scotch
 1918: Dionysos
 1919: Cheap Popularity
 1920: Kirk-Alloway
 1921: Kircubbin
 1922: Royal Lancer
 1923: O'Dempsey
 1924: Zodiac
 1925: Spelthorne
 1926: Sunny View
 1927: Ballyvoy
 1928: Law Suit
 1929: Trigo
 1930: Sol de Terre
 1931: Beaudelaire
 1932: Hill Song
 1933: Harinero
 1934: Primero
 1935: Museum
 1936: Battle Song
 1937: Owenstown
 1938: Ochiltree
 1939: Skoiter
 1940: Harvest Feast
 1941: Etoile de Lyons
 1942: Windsor Slipper
 1943: Solferino
 1944: Water Street
 1945: Spam
 1946: Cassock
 1947: Esprit de France
 1948: Beau Sabreur
 1949: Brown Rover
 1950: Morning Madam
 1951: Do Well
 1952: Judicate
 1953: Sea Charger
 1954: Zarathustra
 1955: Diamond Slipper
 1956: Magnetic North
 1957: Ommeyad
 1958: Royal Highway
 1959: Barclay
 1960: Lynchris
 1961: Vimadee
 1962: Arctic Vale
 1963: Christmas Island
 1964: Biscayne
 1965: Craighouse
 1966: White Gloves
 1967: Dan Kano
 1968: Giolla Mear
 1969: Reindeer
 1970: Allangrange
 1971: Parnell

See also
 Horse racing in Ireland
 Irish Triple Crown race winners
 List of Irish flat horse races

References
 Paris-Turf: 
 Racing Post:

 galopp-sieger.de – Irish St. Leger. horseracingintfed.com – International Federation of Horseracing Authorities – Irish St. Leger (2018). irishracinggreats.com – Irish St. Leger (Group 1). pedigreequery.com – Irish St. Leger – Curragh. tbheritage.com – Irish St Leger.''

Flat races in Ireland
Curragh Racecourse
Open long distance horse races
Recurring sporting events established in 1915
1915 establishments in Ireland